A retail manager (or store manager) is the person ultimately responsible for the day-to-day operations (or management) of a retail store. All employees working in the store report to the retail/store manager. A store manager reports to a district/area or general manager.

Roles and responsibilities
Responsibilities of a store manager include:

 Overall care of staff and their well-being
 Presentation of store and advertising displays
 Recruiting, performance management,  and workplace scheduling
 Product management, including ordering, receiving, price changes, handling damaged products, and returns
 Team Development, facilitating staff learning training, and development
 Problem solving, handling unusual circumstances
 To understand the customer service principles
 To handle problems and questions to customers
 Basic computer applications in stores management and materials control

Sales generation
A store manager must meet the monthly, quarterly, or annual sales goals, depending on the company's fiscal cycle. This involves setting individual sales goals (quotas), holding contests for employees, or offering sales promotions. The manager may also find ways to make employees more productive to meet the goals. Thus, the store manager may be forced to reduce payroll expenditures by decreasing employees' hours, or otherwise reducing operating cost. A store manager should motivate their team to achieve the target set for the store. A store manager should set an example for their subordinates to follow.

Safety and security

The Store manager is the store's primary key-holder and may be called to the store before, during, or after business hours in the event of an emergency. They are also responsible for the safety of all customers and employees on store premises. Store managers may be required to hold safety meetings, especially as dictated by union practices in cases where store employees belong to a union.

Division of responsibility
A store manager may have several subordinates who have management-level responsibility. These employees may be called deputy managers, assistant managers, department managers, supervisors, key holders, shift leads, or leads. Sometimes members of the management team may be several grades below the store manager. One example would be store manager - deputy manager - department manager - department leads.
A store manager has over-all responsibility for all day-to-day activity of the store. Managing & controlling staff, and planning are essential points of the store manager.

Hiring, training and development
The store manager is responsible for hiring, training, and in some cases, development of employees. The manager must ensure staffing levels are adequate to effectively operate the store, and ensure employees receive training necessary for their job responsibilities. Managers may be responsible for developing employees so the company can promote employees from within and develop future leaders, potentially for employment at other locations. Store managers also have the fire powers to any under-performing or misbehaving employees. The role of store managers with regards to the other employees varies from company to company and each respective company's operating methods but in general a store manager will be required to deal with and try to solve any and all problems that may occur at any given time

See also
 List of management topics
 List of marketing topics
 Shopkeeper
 Warehouse

Management occupations
Managers